Pappa Tamne Nahi Samjaay is a 2017 Indian Gujarati-language comedy-drama film written and directed by Dharmesh Mehta, and produced by Alpesh Patel, Harsh Patel and Snehal Trivedi. The casting director of the movie of was Abhishek Shah and it stars Bhavya Gandhi, Manoj Joshi, Ketki Dave in major roles, and Johnny Lever, Shraddha Dangar, Ragi Jani in supporting roles. The songs were composed by Piyush Kanojia and the lyrics written by Niren Bhatt. It was Bhavya Gandhi's and Shraddha Dangar's debut in Gujarati films.

Cast 
 Bhavya Gandhi as Munjal Mehta
 Manoj Joshi as Hasmukhlal Mehta, Munjal's father
 Ketki Dave as Sarla Mehta, Munjal's mother
 Shraddha Dangar as Aashka
 Johnny Lever as College Principal
 Ragi Jani as Neighbour

Soundtrack 
The soundtrack consists of 5 songs composed by Piyush Kanojia with the lyrics being written by Niren Bhatt.

Release 
The film released on 25 August 2017.

References

External links
 

2017 films
2017 comedy-drama films
Indian comedy-drama films
2010s Gujarati-language films